Barry Lee Pearl (born March 29, 1950 in Lancaster, Pennsylvania) is an American actor.

Pearl is best known for his role as "Doody", one of the three supporting T-Birds, in the 1978 film version of Grease. He also had a cameo as Mr. Weaver in the Grease: Live television special on FOX in 2016.

He played "Professor Tinkerputt" in the primetime special Barney's Imagination Island and the US tour of Barney's Big Surprise, a stage production based on the popular TV show as well as a video of the same name. 

He also starred in an episode of Disney Channel's Even Stevens. He began his career in 1961 replacing Johnny Borden as “Randolph MaAfee” in Broadway's Bye Bye Birdie. Other Broadway credits include Oliver! in 1962, A Teaspoon Every Four Hours in 1969, The Producers in 2005, Lenny's Back in 2008 and  Baby It's You! in 2011. In 2012 he starred in the Lionsgate release The Newest Pledge. He also starred as "Arnold" in the national tour of Happy Days - A New Musical.  In 2014, he was part of the series Summer with Cimorelli.

During the summers he teaches film arts all across the US to the special needs community with Joey Travolta's Inclusion Film Company.

Filmography

References

External links

1950 births
Actors from Lancaster, Pennsylvania
Living people
Male actors from Pennsylvania
American male musical theatre actors
American male film actors
American male television actors
20th-century American male actors
21st-century American male actors